Cimanes de la Vega is the most southerly municipality in the province of León, northern Spain. Located along the N-620 highway (León - Benavente), it is close to the Esla River.

It has around 570 inhabitants, grouped in three villages: Cimanes de la Vega, Bariones de la Vega and Lordemanos. Agriculture is the main activity. Irrigation is important as the land is dry.  The main crops are beet (Beta vulgaris), maize (Zea mays) and cattle fodder.

Sights include the "Virgen de la Vega", an 11th-century hermitage.

References

External links
www.cimanesdelavega.com

Province of León